Mohamed Ben Gandoubi (born 6 May 1935) is a Tunisian boxer. He competed in the men's middleweight event at the 1960 Summer Olympics.

References

1935 births
Living people
Tunisian male boxers
Olympic boxers of Tunisia
Boxers at the 1960 Summer Olympics
Sportspeople from Tunis
Middleweight boxers
20th-century Tunisian people